Maria Komnene or Comnena may refer to:

Maria Komnene (daughter of Alexios I) (1085–after 1136), the second eldest daughter of Emperor Alexios I Komnenos and Irene Doukaina
Maria Komnene, niece of Emperor Manuel I Komnenos and wife of the sebastos John Kantakouzenos
Maria Komnene, Queen of Hungary (1144–1190), wife of Stephen IV of Hungary
Maria Komnene (daughter of Manuel I) (1152–1182), the eldest daughter of Emperor Manuel I Komnenos and Bertha of Sulzbach
Maria Komnene, Queen of Jerusalem (c. 1150–1208/17), second wife of King Amalric I of Jerusalem and mother of Isabella of Jerusalem
Maria Komnene (1328-1408), daughter of Basil and sister of Alexios III of Trebizond
Maria Komnene of Trebizond (1404-1439), third wife of Emperor John VIII Palaiologos and last Empress consort of the Byzantine Empire